Nova Borova is a town urban-type settlement in Zhytomyr Raion, Zhytomyr Oblast, Ukraine. Population:  In 2001, population was 5,746.

References

Urban-type settlements in Zhytomyr Raion
Zhitomirsky Uyezd
Zhytomyr Raion